The Renault Egeus was a concept mid-size luxury crossover SUV presented at the 2005 Frankfurt Motor Show developed by Renault. It was described as an upmarket 4WD crossover SUV. The Renault Egeus is then succeeded by the Renault Initiale Paris and the Renault Ondelios.

Engine

References

Egeus
Cars introduced in 2005
All-wheel-drive vehicles
Luxury sport utility vehicles
Crossover sport utility vehicles